Hasanabad-e Darreh Zereshk (also Romanized as Ḩasanābād-e Darreh Zereshk; also known as Ḩasanābād) is a village in Dehshir Rural District, in the Central District of Taft County, Yazd Province, Iran. At the 2006 census, its population was 48, in 19 families.

References 

Populated places in Taft County